Johannes Wilhelm Arthur "Hänschen" Frömming (28 June 1910 – 8 November 1996) was a German harness racing driver and trainer. He is one of the most legendary horsemen in European harness racing.

Frömming started his career at the age of 16 in 1926 and drove his last race in 1988. He won a total of 5,592 races. Frömming's major racing wins include three Prix d'Amérique and four Elitloppet victories. He was the German driving champion 11 times in a row from 1934 to 1944 and again in 1947 and 1948. In 1950 and 1953 Frömming tied the title with Gerhard Krüger.

Awards and honors 
During World War II Frömming employed three Jewish horsemen on his farm outside Berlin and hid them from the Nazi authorities. He was later honored for his action by B'nai B'rith International in New York City. In 1972 Frömming received the Order of Merit of the Federal Republic of Germany. He was nominated to the Germany's Sports Hall of Fame in 2008.

The Johannes Frömming Memorial is raced annually at the Bahrenfeld Racetrack in Hamburg. There is a street named for him near the former Hamburg race track Farmsen.

Major racing victories 
Germany
Deutsches Traber-Derby – Xifra (1933), Adriatica (1940), Alwa (1941), Stella Maris (1943), Avanti (1947), Docht (1951), Dom (1953), Ditmarsia (1961), Salesiana (1965), Kurio (1972), Alsterhof (1974)
Austria
Graf Kalman Hunyady Memorial – Xiphias (1936), Peter von Lurup (1938), Iltis (1943), Van der Hölgy (1944), Ejadon (1953), Eileen Eden (1970)
Österreichisches Traber-Derby – Van der Hölgy (1942), Kaaba (1944), Damara S (1976), Daniel (1977)
Denmark
Copenhagen Cup – Eidelstedter (1962)
France
Prix d'Amérique – Nike Hanover (1964), Ozo (1965), Delmonica Hanover (1974)
Prix de France – Elma (1966)
Italy
Campionato Europeo – Hit Song (1955), Eileen Eden (1968, 1969, 1970)
Gran Premio Lotteria – Eileen Eden (1968, 1969) 
Sweden
Elitloppet – Eidelstedter (1962), Elma (1965), Eileen Eden (1968, 1970)
Åby Stora Pris – Ejadon (1955)
United States
Challenge Cup – Nike Hanover (1964)

Sources 
Germany's Trotting Hall of Fame (in German)
Germany's Sports Hall of Fame (in German)

References 

1910 births
1996 deaths
German harness racers
German horse trainers
Sportspeople from Berlin
People who rescued Jews during the Holocaust
Commanders Crosses of the Order of Merit of the Federal Republic of Germany